Wiesbach is a river of Bavaria, Germany.

The Wiesbach springs near Frauenhaselbach, a district of Neumarkt-Sankt Veit). It is a left tributary of the Rott near the district Hörbering of Neumarkt-Sankt Veit.

See also
List of rivers of Bavaria

References

Rivers of Bavaria
Rivers of Germany